Living On The Edge is a weekly Indian TV show about environmental issues. It was aired on the Indian national broadcast network, Doordarshan and Star TV over a period of five years, in the 90s.

Hosted by Niret Alva, it explored different aspects of human exploitation of nature and natural resources and pollution. It was launched on the day of the 1994 final Football World Cup and managed to garner a large audience, as it was slotted just before the final match began.

Popularity 

At the time of airing, Living On The Edge was one of the most popular English programmes on Indian Television. However, the show was taken off air in 1996 for lack of sponsorship.

Awards 

 Won the Most Informative Series Category at the Onida Awards in 1995
 Won a Panda award at Wildscreen in Bristol in 1996

References

Sources

External links 
 Living On The Edge Page on Miditech

Indian television series
English-language television shows
1994 Indian television series debuts
1996 Indian television series endings